Brukna Manor is a manor house in Dāviņi parish, Bauska Municipality in the historical region of Zemgale, in Latvia.

History 
By 1920 Korff noble family of German-Baltic aristocrats, was the builders and owners of the Brukna Manor. In Zemgale and Kurzeme they owned several manors, among them Skaistkalne Manor, which is located about 20 kilometers from Brukna. The Brukna Manor ensemble was built in the third quarter of the 18th century, but the present appearance of the manor is result of manor reconstruction in a neoclassical style, which was done in the second quarter of the 19th century.
After Latvia's agrarian reform of 1920, the manor house housed an elementary school. From 1927 to 1931 it underwent repairs. In 1966 the school was closed  manor house was converted into apartment building. In the Great Castle Hall was set movie stage and room for a movie mechanic.

Since 2001, the manor has been run by a non-profit organization called the Mountain Blessing Community, based on ideas of Cenacolo. Instead of medications rehabilitation is achieved through  prayer and occupational therapy.

In 2011, the Mountain Blessing Community carried out a project funded by the Mortgage and Land Bank entitled "Renovation of the Renaissance Garden at Brukna  Manor" and a project by European Union European Agricultural Fund for Rural Development (EAFRD) "Simplified Renovation of Brukna Manor".

See also
List of palaces and manor houses in Latvia

References

External links

  Brukna Manor

Manor houses in Latvia